The 1896 Summer Olympics, officially known as the Games of the I Olympiad and commonly known as Athens 1896, was the first international Olympic Games held in modern history. Organised by the International Olympic Committee (IOC), which had been created by French aristocrat Pierre de Coubertin, it was held in Athens, Greece, from 6 to 15 April 1896.

Fourteen nations (according to the IOC, though the number is subject to interpretation) and 241 athletes (all males; this number is also disputed) took part in the games. Participants were all European, or living in Europe, with the exception of the United States team. Over 65% of the competing athletes were Greek. Winners were given a silver medal, while runners-up received a copper medal. Retroactively, the IOC has converted these to gold and silver, and awarded bronze medals to third placed athletes. Ten of the 14 participating nations earned medals. The United States won the most gold medals, 11, while host nation Greece won the most medals overall, 47. The highlight for the Greeks was the marathon victory by their compatriot Spyridon Louis. The most successful competitor was German wrestler and gymnast Carl Schuhmann, who won four events.

Athens had been unanimously chosen to stage the inaugural modern Games during a congress organised by Coubertin in Paris on 23 June 1894, during which the IOC was also created, because Greece was the birthplace of the Ancient Olympic Games. The main venue was the Panathenaic Stadium, where athletics and wrestling took place; other venues included the Neo Phaliron Velodrome for cycling, and the Zappeion for fencing. The opening ceremony was held in the Panathenaic Stadium on 6 April, during which most of the competing athletes were aligned on the infield, grouped by nation. After a speech by the president of the organising committee, Crown Prince Constantine, his father officially opened the Games. Afterwards, nine bands and 150 choir singers performed an Olympic Hymn, composed by Spyridon Samaras, with words by poet Kostis Palamas.

The 1896 Olympics were regarded as a great success. The Games had the largest international participation of any sporting event to that date. The Panathenaic Stadium overflowed with the largest crowd ever to watch a sporting event. After the Games, Coubertin and the IOC were petitioned by several prominent figures, including Greece's King George and some of the American competitors in Athens, to hold all the following Games in Athens. However, the 1900 Summer Olympics were already planned for Paris and, except for the Intercalated Games of 1906, the Olympics did not return to Greece until the 2004 Summer Olympics, 108 years later.

Reviving the Games 

During the 19th century, several small-scale sports festivals across Europe were named after the Ancient Olympic Games. The 1870 Olympics at the Panathenaic stadium, which had been refurbished for the occasion, had an audience of 30,000 people. Pierre de Coubertin, a French pedagogue and historian, adopted Dr William Penny Brookes' idea to establish a multi-national and multi-sport event—the ancient games only allowed male athletes of Greek origin to participate. In 1890, Coubertin wrote an article in La Revue Athletique, which espoused the importance of Much Wenlock, a rural market town in the English county of Shropshire. It was here that, in October 1850, the local physician William Penny Brookes had founded the Wenlock Olympian Games, a festival of sports and recreations that included athletics and team sports, such as cricket, football and quoits. Coubertin also took inspiration from the earlier Greek games organised under the name of Olympics by businessman and philanthropist Evangelis Zappas in 1859, 1870 and 1875. The 1896 Athens Games were funded by the legacies of Evangelis Zappas and his cousin Konstantinos Zappas and by George Averoff who had been specifically requested by the Greek government, through crown prince Constantine, to sponsor the second refurbishment of the Panathenaic Stadium. The Greek government did this despite the cost of refurbishing the stadium in marble already being funded in full by Evangelis Zappas forty years earlier.

On 18 June 1894, Coubertin organised a congress at the Sorbonne, Paris, to present his plans to representatives of sports societies from 11 countries. Following his proposal's acceptance by the congress, a date for the first modern Olympic Games needed to be chosen. Coubertin suggested that the Games be held concurrently with the 1900 Universal Exposition of Paris. Concerned that a six-year waiting period might lessen public interest, congress members opted instead to hold the inaugural Games in 1896. With a date established, members of the congress turned their attention to the selection of a host city. It remains a mystery how Athens was finally chosen to host the inaugural Games. In the following years both Coubertin and Demetrius Vikelas would offer recollections of the selection process that contradicted the official minutes of the congress. Most accounts hold that several congressmen first proposed London as the location, but Coubertin dissented. After a brief discussion with Vikelas, who represented Greece, Coubertin suggested Athens. Vikelas made the Athens proposal official on 23 June, and since Greece had been the original home of the Olympics, the congress unanimously approved the decision. Vikelas was then elected the first president of the newly established International Olympic Committee (IOC).

Organization 

News that the Olympic Games would return to Greece was well received by the Greek public, media, and royal family. According to Coubertin, "the Crown Prince Constantine learned with great pleasure that the Games will be inaugurated in Athens." Coubertin went on to confirm that, "the King and the Crown Prince will confer their patronage on the holding of these games." Constantine later conferred more than that; he eagerly assumed the presidency of the 1896 organising committee.

However, the country had financial troubles and was in political turmoil. The job of prime minister alternated between Charilaos Trikoupis and Theodoros Deligiannis frequently during the last years of the 19th century. Because of this financial and political instability, both prime minister Trikoupis and Stephanos Dragoumis, the president of the Zappas Olympic Committee, which had attempted to organise a series of national Olympiads, believed that Greece could not host the event. In late 1894, the organising committee under Stephanos Skouloudis presented a report that the cost of the Games would be three times higher than originally estimated by Coubertin. They concluded the Games could not be held, and offered their resignation. The total cost of the Games was 3,740,000 gold drachmas.

With the prospect of reviving the Olympic games very much in doubt, Coubertin and Vikelas commenced a campaign to keep the Olympic movement alive. Their efforts culminated on 7 January 1895 when Vikelas announced that crown prince Constantine would assume the presidency of the organising committee. His first responsibility was to raise the funds necessary to host the Games. He relied on the patriotism of the Greek people to motivate them to provide the required finances. Constantine's enthusiasm sparked a wave of contributions from the Greek public. This grassroots effort raised 330,000 drachmas. A special set of postage stamps were commissioned; the sale of which raised 400,000 drachmas. Ticket sales added 200,000 drachmas. At the request of Constantine, businessman George Averoff agreed to pay for the restoration of the Panathenaic Stadium. Averoff would donate 920,000 drachmas to this project. As a tribute to his generosity, a statue of Averoff was constructed and unveiled on 5 April 1896 outside the stadium. It stands there to this day.

Some of the athletes would take part in the Games because they happened to be in Athens at the time the Games were held, either on holiday or for work (e.g., some of the British competitors worked for the British embassy). A designated Olympic Village for the athletes did not appear until the 1932 Summer Olympics. Consequently, the athletes had to provide their own lodging.

The first regulation voted on by the new IOC in 1894 was to allow only amateur athletes to participate in the Olympic Games. The various contests were thus held under amateur regulations with the exception of fencing matches. The rules and regulations were not uniform, so the Organising Committee had to choose among the codes of the various national athletic associations. The jury, the referees and the game director bore the same names as in antiquity (Ephor, Helanodic and Alitarc). Prince George acted as final referee; according to Coubertin, "his presence gave weight and authority to the decisions of the ephors".

Women were not entitled to compete at the 1896 Summer Olympics, because de Coubertin felt that their inclusion would be "impractical, uninteresting, unaesthetic and incorrect".

Venues 

Seven venues were used for the 1896 Summer Olympics. Panathenaic Stadium was the main venue, hosting four of the nine sports contested. The city of Marathon served as host to the marathon event and the individual road race events. Swimming was held in the Bay of Zea, fencing at the Zappeion, sport shooting at Kallithea, and tennis at the Athens Lawn Tennis Club. Tennis was a sport unfamiliar to Greeks at the time of the 1896 Games.

The Bay of Zea is a seaport and marina in the Athens area; it was used as the swimming venue because the organizers of the Games wanted to avoid spending money on constructing a special purpose swimming venue.

Four of the 1896 venues were reused as competition venues for the 2004 Games. The velodrome would be renovated into a football stadium in 1964 and was known as Karaiskakis Stadium. This venue was renovated in 2003 for use as a football venue for the 2004 Games. During the 2004 Games, Panathinaiko Stadium served as host for archery competitions and was the finish line for the athletic marathon event. The city of Marathon itself served as the starting point for both marathon events during the 2004 Games. The Zappeion served as the first home of the organizing committee (ATHOC) for the 2004 Games from 1998 to 1999, and served as the main communications center during those Games.

Calendar

Opening ceremony 

On 6 April (25 March according to the Julian calendar then in use in Greece), the games of the First Olympiad were officially opened; it was Easter Monday for both the Western and Eastern Christian Churches and the anniversary of Greece's independence. The Panathenaic Stadium was filled with an estimated 80,000 spectators, including King George I of Greece, his wife Olga, and their sons. Most of the competing athletes were aligned on the infield, grouped by nation. After a speech by the president of the organising committee, Crown Prince Constantine, his father officially opened the Games with the words (in Greek):

Afterwards, nine bands and 150 choir singers performed an Olympic Hymn, composed by Spyridon Samaras, with words by poet Kostis Palamas. Thereafter, a variety of musical offerings provided the backgrounds to the Opening Ceremonies until 1960, since which time the Samaras/Palamas composition has become the official Olympic Anthem (decision taken by the IOC Session in 1958). Other elements of current Olympic opening ceremonies were initiated later: the Olympic flame was first lit in 1928, the first athletes' oath was sworn at the 1920 Summer Olympics, and the first officials' oath was taken at the 1972 Olympic Games.

Events 
At the 1894 Sorbonne congress, a large roster of sports were suggested for the program in Athens. The first official announcements regarding the sporting events to be held featured sports such as football and cricket, but these plans were never finalised, and these sports did not make the final list for the Games. Rowing and sailing were also scheduled but were cancelled on the planned days of competition: sailing due to lack of special boats and rowing due to poor weather. As a result, the 1896 Summer Olympics programme featured 9 sports encompassing 10 disciplines and 43 events. The number of events in each discipline is noted in parentheses.

Athletics 

The athletics events had the most international field of any of the sports. The major highlight was the marathon, held for the first time in international competition. Spyridon Louis, a previously unrecognised water carrier, won the event to become the only Greek athletics champion and a national hero. Although Greece had been favoured to win the discus and the shot put, the best Greek athletes finished just behind the American Robert Garrett in both events.

No world records were set, as few top international competitors had elected to compete. In addition, the curves of the track were very tight, making fast times in the running events virtually impossible. Despite this, Thomas Burke, of the United States, won the 100-meter race in 12.0 seconds and the 400-meter race in 54.2 seconds. Burke was the only one who used the "crouch start" (putting his knee on soil), confusing the jury. Eventually, he was allowed to start from this "uncomfortable position".

Chile claims one athlete, Luis Subercaseaux, who competed for the nation at the 1896 Summer Olympics. This makes Chile one of the 14 nations to appear at the inaugural Summer Olympic Games. Subercaseaux's results are not listed in the official report, though that report typically includes only winners and Subercaseaux won no medals. Some sources claim that he was entered to compete in the 100m, 400m and 800m events but did not start. An appraisal of a famous photo of series 2 of the 100 meters sprint, performed by facial recognition experts of the Chilean forensic police, concluded that Subercaseaux was one of the participants.

The day after the official marathon Stamata Revithi ran the 40-kilometer course in 5 hours 30 minutes, finishing outside Panathinaiko Stadium. However, some of the authors, who believe that "Melpomene" and Revithi are the same person, attribute to the latter the more favorable time of  hours. She was denied entry into the official race as the 1896 Olympics excluded women from competition.

Cycling 

The rules of the International Cycling Association were used for the cycling competitions. The track cycling events were held at the newly built Neo Phaliron Velodrome. Only one road event was held, a race from Athens to Marathon and back (87 kilometres).

In the track events, the best cyclist was Frenchman Paul Masson, who won the one lap time trial, the sprint event, and the 10,000 meters. In the 100 kilometres event, Masson entered as a pacemaker for his compatriot Léon Flameng. Flameng won the event, after a fall, and after stopping to wait for his Greek opponent Georgios Kolettis to fix a mechanical problem. The Austrian fencer Adolf Schmal won the 12-hour race, which was completed by only two cyclists, while the road race event was won by Aristidis Konstantinidis.

Fencing 

The fencing events were held in the Zappeion, which, built with money Evangelis Zappas had given to revive the ancient Olympic Games, had never seen any athletic contests before. Unlike other sports (in which only amateurs were allowed to take part at the Olympics), professionals were authorised to compete in fencing, though in a separate event. These professionals were considered gentlemen athletes, just like the amateurs.

Four events were scheduled, but the épée event was cancelled for unknown reasons. The foil event was won by a Frenchman, Eugène-Henri Gravelotte, who beat his countryman, Henri Callot, in the final. The other two events, the sabre and the masters foil, were won by Greek fencers. Leonidas Pyrgos, who won the latter event, became the first Greek Olympic champion in the modern era.

Gymnastics 

The gymnastics competition was carried out on the infield of the Panathinaiko Stadium. Germany had sent an 11-man team, which won five of the eight events, including both team events. In the team event on the horizontal bar, the German team was unopposed. Three Germans added individual titles: Hermann Weingärtner won the horizontal bar event, Alfred Flatow won the parallel bars; and Carl Schuhmann, who also competed successfully in wrestling, won the vault. Louis Zutter, a Swiss gymnast, won the pommel horse, while Greeks Ioannis Mitropoulos and Nikolaos Andriakopoulos were victorious in the rings and rope climbing events, respectively.

Sailing and rowing 

A regatta of sailing boats was on the program of the Games of the First Olympiad for 31 March 1896 (Julian calendar). However this event had to be given up.

The official English report states:

The German version states:

Rowing races were scheduled for the next day, 1 April 1896 (Julian); however, poor weather forced their cancellation.

The official English report states:

The German rower, Berthold Küttner, wrote several articles about the 1896 Games that were published in his Berlin rowing club's magazine in 1936 and reprinted in the Journal of Olympic History in 2012. He stated that he and Adolf Jäger had lined up for the start of the double sculls event. He further wrote that "The double scull would be the first to start because the wind had become much stronger. On a fishing boat we took our double scull to the starting line. We already had problems getting into the double scull because of the swells. From our opponents no one had appeared – although both Greeks and Italians had applied. Because a longer wait for them seemed pointless, the starter told us to sail without competition.

"After the official salutation and presentation in the Court Loge, where many of the attendees could not hide a laugh about my clothing, Prince George, President of the Committee, praised me for our appearance at the racing track and presented me with the winners medal in bronze. At the same time he also gave me one for Bundesbruder Jäger. The commemorative medal, which each of the participants received, had already been presented to us earlier."

He went on to state that the single sculls and race for naval boats were postponed until the following day, then ultimately cancelled when the weather worsened. The International Olympic Committee does not recognize any of this.

Shooting 

Held at a range at Kallithea, the shooting competition consisted of five events—two using a rifle and three with the pistol. The first event, the military rifle, was won by Pantelis Karasevdas, the only competitor to hit the target with all of his shots. The second event, for military pistols, was dominated by two American brothers: John and Sumner Paine. They became the first siblings to finish first and second in the same event. To avoid embarrassing their hosts, the brothers decided that only one of them would compete in the next pistol event, the free pistol. Sumner Paine won that event, thereby becoming the first relative of an Olympic champion to become Olympic champion himself.

The Paine brothers did not compete in the 25-meter pistol event, as the event judges determined that their weapons were not of the required calibre. In their absence, Ioannis Phrangoudis won. The final event, the free rifle, began on the same day. However, the event could not be completed due to darkness and was finalised the next morning, when Georgios Orphanidis was crowned the champion.

Swimming 

The swimming competition was held in the open sea because the organizers had refused to spend the money necessary for a specially constructed stadium. Nearly 20,000 spectators lined the Bay of Zea off the Piraeus coast to watch the events. The water in the bay was cold, and the competitors suffered during their races. There were three open events (men's 100-metre freestyle, men's 500-metre freestyle, and men's 1200 metre freestyle), in addition to a special event open only to Greek sailors, all of which were held on the same day (11 April).

For Alfréd Hajós of Hungary, this meant he could only compete in two of the events, as they were held too close together, which made it impossible for him to adequately recuperate. Nevertheless, he won the two events in which he swam, the 100 and 1200 meter freestyle. Hajós later became one of only two Olympians to win a medal in both the athletic and artistic competitions, when he won a silver medal for architecture in 1924. The 500-meter freestyle was won by Austrian swimmer Paul Neumann, who defeated his opponents by more than a minute and a half.

Tennis 

Although tennis was already a major sport by the end of the 19th century, none of the top players turned up for the tournament in Athens. The competition was held at the courts of the Athens Lawn Tennis Club, and the infield of the velodrome used for the cycling events. John Pius Boland, who won the event, had been entered in the competition by a fellow-student of his at Oxford; the Greek, Konstantinos Manos. As a member of the Athens Lawn Tennis sub-committee, Manos had been trying, with the assistance of Boland, to recruit competitors for the Athens Games from among the sporting circles of Oxford University. In the first round, Boland defeated Friedrich Traun, a promising tennis player from Hamburg, who had been eliminated in the 100-meter sprint competition. Boland and Traun decided to team up for the doubles event, in which they reached the final and defeated their Greek opponents after losing the first set.

Weightlifting 

The sport of weightlifting was still young in 1896, and the rules differed from those in use today. Competitions were held outdoors, in the infield of the main stadium, and there were no weight limits. The first event was held in a style now known as the "clean and jerk". Two competitors stood out: Scotsman Launceston Elliot and Viggo Jensen of Denmark. Both of them lifted the same weight; but the jury, with Prince George as the chairman, ruled that Jensen had done so in a better style. The British delegation, unfamiliar with this tie-breaking rule, lodged a protest. The lifters were eventually allowed to make further attempts, but neither lifter improved, and Jensen was declared the champion.

Elliot got his revenge in the one hand lift event, which was held immediately after the two-handed one. Jensen had been slightly injured during his last two-handed attempt, and was no match for Elliot, who won the competition easily. The Greek audience was charmed by the Scottish victor, whom they considered very attractive. A curious incident occurred during the weightlifting event: a servant was ordered to remove the weights, which appeared to be a difficult task for him. Prince George came to his assistance; he picked up the weight and threw it a considerable distance with ease, to the delight of the crowd.

Wrestling 

No weight classes existed for the wrestling competition, held in the Panathenaic Stadium, which meant that there would only be one winner among competitors of all sizes. The rules used were similar to modern Greco-Roman wrestling, although there was no time limit, and not all leg holds were forbidden (in contrast to current rules).

Apart from the two Greek contestants, all the competitors had previously been active in other sports. Weightlifting champion Launceston Elliot faced gymnastics champion Carl Schuhmann. The latter won and advanced into the final, where he met Georgios Tsitas, who had previously defeated Stephanos Christopoulos. Darkness forced the final match to be suspended after 40 minutes; it was continued the following day, when Schuhmann needed only fifteen minutes to finish the bout.

Closing ceremony 

On the morning of Sunday 12 April (or 31 March, according to the Julian calendar then used in Greece), King George organised a banquet for officials and athletes (even though some competitions had not yet been held). During his speech, he made clear that, as far as he was concerned, the Olympics should be held in Athens permanently. The official closing ceremony was held the following Wednesday, after being postponed from Tuesday due to rain. Again the royal family attended the ceremony, which was opened by the national anthem of Greece and an ode composed in ancient Greek by George S. Robertson, a British athlete and scholar.

Afterwards, the king awarded prizes to the winners. Unlike today, the first-place winners received a silver medal, an olive branch and a diploma, while runners-up received a copper medal, a laurel branch, and diploma. Third place winners did not receive a prize.

Some winners also received additional prizes, such as Spyridon Louis, who received a cup from Michel Bréal, a friend of Coubertin, who had conceived the marathon event. Louis then led the medalists on a lap of honour around the stadium, while the Olympic Hymn was played again. The King then formally announced that the first Olympiad was at an end, and left the Stadium, while the band played the Greek national hymn and the crowd cheered.

Like the Greek king, many others supported the idea of holding the next Games in Athens; most of the American competitors signed a letter to the Crown Prince expressing this wish. Coubertin, however, was heavily opposed to this idea, as he envisioned international rotation as one of the cornerstones of the modern Olympics. According to his wish, the next Games were held in Paris, although they would be somewhat overshadowed by the concurrently held Universal Exposition.

Participating nations 

The concept of national teams was not a major part of the Olympic movement until the Intercalated Games 10 years later, though many sources list the nationality of competitors in 1896 and give medal counts. There are significant conflicts with regard to which nations competed. The International Olympic Committee gives a figure of 14, but does not list them. The following 14 are most likely the ones recognised by the IOC. Olympedia lists 13, excluding Chile; other sources list 12, excluding Chile and Bulgaria; others list 13, including those two but excluding Italy. Egypt is also sometimes included because of the participation of Dionysios Kasdaglis, a Greek national who resided in Alexandria after living in Great Britain for years. Belgium and Russia had entered the names of competitors, but withdrew.

Number of athletes by National Olympic Committees

National Olympic Committees did not yet exist. Over 65% of all athletes were Greek.

Medal count 

Ten of the 14 participating nations earned medals, in addition to two medals won by mixed teams, i.e. teams made up of athletes from multiple nations. The IOC has retroactively assigned gold, silver and bronze medals to the three best placed athletes in each event to comport with more recent traditions. The United States won the most gold medals (11), while host nation Greece won the most medals overall (47) as well as the most silver (18) and bronze (19) medals, finishing with one fewer gold medal than the United States, having 155 athletes more than the U.S.

To sort this table by nation, total medal count, or any other column, click on the  icon next to the column title.

Key

Podium sweeps

Notes 
  The number of countries, given by the International Olympic Committee, is open to interpretation and could be as few as 10 and as many as 15. There are numerous reasons for the disparity: National teams hardly existed at the time, and most athletes represented themselves or their clubs. In addition, countries were not always as well-defined as they are today. The number of countries here reflects the number used by most modern sources, including the International Olympic Committee website. See the relevant section for further details.
  The number of competitors given according to the International Olympic Committee. The identities of 179 competitors are known. Mallon & Widlund calculate 245 athletes, while De Wael finds 246.

References

External links 

 
 1896 Olympic Games Programme – UK Parliament Living Heritage

Further reading 

 
 
 
 
 
 
 
 
 
 
 
 
 
 
 
 
 
 
 
 
 
 
 
 
 
 
 
 

 
19th century in Athens
1896 in Greek sport
History of Greece (1863–1909)
Olympic Games in Greece
Sports competitions in Athens
Summer Olympics by year
O
Summer Olympics
Summer Olympics
April 1896 sports events